Xfinity Streampix is an online on demand media streaming service offered by Comcast that launched on February 23, 2012, with shows from ABC, NBC, Scripps, Cookie Jar and Lionsgate as well as movies from Sony Pictures, Universal, Snag, Disney and Warner Bros.  The service is designed to compete with other online streaming services such as Netflix, Amazon Video, and Hulu. The service costs $5 per month, while Comcast customers who subscribe to Internet Plus, Internet Pro Plus, HD Preferred Plus XF Triple Play, HD Premier XF Triple Play or HD Complete XF Triple Play packages receive access to the service at no additional charge.

In late 2019, Comcast announced they will add all four StreamPix channels, StreamPix, StreamPix Westerns, StreamPix Action, StreamPix Voices, to their linear channel lineup. HD versions are available for subscribers using Xfinity set-top-boxes, while SD versions are available for CableCard users including TiVo, silicondust HDHomeRun Prime, and Ceton InfiniTV.

See also
 Xfinity
 Vudu

References

External links
 

Streaming media systems
Subscription video on demand services